An air operator's certificate (AOC) is the approval granted by a civil aviation authority (CAA) to an aircraft operator to allow it to use aircraft for commercial purposes. This requires the operator to have personnel, assets, and system in place to ensure the safety of its employees, and the general public. The certificate will list the aircraft types, and registrations to be used, for what purpose and in what area – specific airports or geographic region.

Categories
AOCs can be granted for one or more of the following activities: 
Aerial advertising
Aerial photography
Aerial spotting
Aerial surveying
Air ambulance or aeromedical
Charter (low capacity and high capacity)
Firefighting
Flight training
Regular public transport (RPT) (low capacity and high capacity)

Low capacity operations is when operating aircraft with under 38 passenger seats, high capacity is above that.

Requirements
The requirements for obtaining an AOC vary from country to country, but are generally defined as:
 Sufficient personnel with the required experience for the type of operations requested.
 Airworthy aircraft, suitable for the type of operations requested.
 Acceptable systems for the training of crew and the operation of the aircraft (Operations Manual).
 A quality system to ensure that all applicable regulations are followed.
 The appointment of key accountable staff, who are responsible for specific safety critical functions such as training, maintenance and operations.
 Carriers Liability Insurance (for Airlines) – Operators are to have sufficient insurance to cover the injury or death of any passenger carried.
 Proof that the operator has sufficient finances to fund the operation.
 The operator has sufficient ground infrastructure, or arrangements for the supply of sufficient infrastructure, to support its operations into the ports requested.
 The certificate is held by a legal person who resides in the country or region of application (for EASA).

International variations
An AOC is referred to as an Air Carrier Operating Certificate in the United States and as an Air Operator Certification in New Zealand.

New Zealand 
Civil Aviation Authority of New Zealand's Part 119 establishes Air Operator Certification rules for Air Transport Operations (ATO) and Commercial Transport Operations (CTO). They provide two levels of certification: (a) AOC for air operations in all sizes of aircraft; (b) general aviation AOC for air operations in helicopters and aircraft with nine or less passenger seats.

United States 
According to the United States Department of Transportation, the Federal Aviation Administration is to maintain an airline air carrier's operating certificate in the category of fitness. An air carrier must maintain the following three standards: adequate financing, competent management, a willingness to comply with applicable laws and regulations. At least 75 percent of airlines controlling voting equity must be held by US citizens.

Transfer
An AOC is valuable. It shows the relevant NAA's acceptance of the operator's personnel, infrastructure and procedures. In most jurisdictions an AOC may be sold or acquired to avoid the arduous process of gaining regulator acceptance for a new AOC. To this end, a failed airline can be sold as a going concern and then changed into another business. For example, Northwest Airlines bought FLYi airline's AOC to start Compass Airlines, now a feeder airline for Delta Air Lines marketed as Delta Connection. Likewise Strategic Airlines purchased the AOC, staff and routes of the failed OzJet airlines.

References

External links

CAA UK – List of UK AOC Holders
FAA USE – Searchable Database of Certificate Holders

Aviation licenses and certifications
Aviation safety
Civil aviation